Pempeliella macedoniella is a species of snout moth. It is found in North Macedonia.

The wingspan is about 12 mm.

References

Moths described in 1887
Phycitini